Lutyens' Delhi is an area in New Delhi, India, named after the British architect Sir Edwin Lutyens (1869–1944), who was responsible for much of the architectural design and building during the period of the British Raj, when India was part of the British Empire in the 1920s and 1930s and 1940s. This also includes the Lutyens Bungalow Zone (LBZ).

Sir Edwin Lutyens, the architect of Delhi, designed 4 bungalows in the Rashtrapati Bhavan Estate, (Viceroy House Estate); now, these bungalows lie on the Mother Teresa Crescent (then Willingdon Crescent). Lutyens, apart from designing the Viceroy's House, designed large government building and was involved with town planning.

Sir Herbert Baker, who also designed with the Secretariat Buildings (North and South Block), designed bungalows on the then King George's Avenue (south of the Secretariats) for high-ranking officials. Other members of the team of architects were Robert Tor Russell, who built Connaught Place, the Eastern and Western Courts on Janpath, Teen Murti House (formerly called Flagstaff House), Safdarjung Airport (formerly Willingdon Airfield), Irwin Amphitheatre (renamed Major Dhyan Chand National Stadium) and several government houses, William Henry Nicholls, CG Blomfield, FB Blomfield, Walter Sykes George, Arthur Gordon Shoosmith and Henry Medd.

It is on the 2002 World Monuments Watch list of 100 Most Endangered Sites made by World Monuments Fund, a heritage organization based in New York.

History
The area was constructed after the British decided to move the capital of their Indian Empire from Calcutta to Delhi, by creating a new district of the latter entitled New Delhi.

Before the new imperial capital was established in 1911, the Old Delhi Railway Station served the Agra-Delhi railways, the line cut through what is today called Lutyens' Delhi. The line was eventually shifted to make way for the new capital and the New Delhi Railway Station was built near Ajmeri Gate in 1926.

Design and construction

Lutyens led a group of architects in laying out the central administrative area of the city, with the charge of retaining one-third of the area as green space. At the heart of the city was the impressive Rashtrapati Bhawan (formerly known as Viceroy's House), located on the top of Raisina Hill. The Kartavya Path (formerly Kingsway and Rajpath) connects India Gate (formerly known as All India War Memorial) to Rashtrapati Bhawan, while Janpath (formerly Queensway), which crosses it at a right angle, connects South End Road (renamed as Rajesh Pilot Marg) with Connaught Place. Currently, Droupadi Murmu is the President of India, and stays in the official house of Rashtrapati Bhawan.

The Secretariat Building, which house various ministries of the Government of India including the Prime Minister's Office, is beside the Rashtrapati Bhawan and was designed by Herbert Baker. Also designed by Baker was the Parliament House (also known as Sansad Bhavan), located on the Sansad Marg, running parallel with the Rajpath. Two magnificent cathedrals in the area, the Anglican Cathedral Church of the Redemption and Catholic Sacred Heart Cathedral were designed by Henry Medd.

Lutyens Bungalow Zone
The Lutyens Bungalow Zone covers an area of about 26 km2. It is a very important and expensive zone in New Delhi. There are about 1000 bungalows in the LBZ, of which less than ten percent are in private hands.

In order to create development control norms, the Ministry of Urban Development constituted the 'New Delhi Redevelopment Advisory Committee' (NDRAC) in 1972, when the redevelopment of the areas around the walled city, north of Connaught Place and on Prithviraj Road was taken up.

Land prices

Contiguous areas
Around the great green expanse of the LBZ, is a thick swathe of green, a glacis of trees, and manicured lawns, and grand buildings, that protect and cushion LBZ from the swirl and swarm of Delhi's crowded parts: on the west is the vast wooded area of the Delhi Ridge, adjoining the grand acres of the Presidential Estate; to the west and south is Nehru Park, the Race Course, the Air force station, the Delhi Gymkhana Club, Safdarjung Airport, Safdarjang Tomb, and the Diplomatic enclave; to the south is the Lodi Gardens, with its fabulous Lodhi era tombs, and remains; on the SE are great lavishly tended greens of Delhi Golf Club, with its Mughal era ruins; and beyond the Golf course, on the edge of the LBZ boundary is the green stretch of National Zoological Park, lakes, the Purana Qila, and the Humayun's Tomb. The contiguous areas are lavished with as much care by the government as the LBZ. Those who can't buy into the LBZ buy into the contiguous areas, like Jhor Bagh, where property prices are almost as steep as in the LBZ.

Notable residents
The former Prime Minister Manmohan Singh, also resides here. He was allotted a Type VIII bungalow, on 3 Motilal Nehru Marg (formerly known as York Road), previously occupied by Delhi chief minister Sheila Dikshit, on 27 February 2014 by Kamal Nath Minister of Urban Development, on account of his being Rajya Sabha MP from Assam. Sonia Gandhi and Rahul Gandhi are a few more politicians who live here at 10 Janpath Former Prime Ministers, not a member of Parliament (MP), are not entitled to a government bungalow, however, Atal Bihari Vajpayee, another former Prime Minister and not a Member of any house, resided in a bungalow on Krishna Menon Marg since 2005.

Notable businessmen include Laxmi N Mittal, KP Singh, Sunil Mittal, C. K. Birla, Shashi Ruia, Ravi Ruia, Analjit Singh, Vijay Shekhar Sharma and Atul Punj.

Gallery

See also
Beaux-Arts architecture
Chanakyapuri

References

External links
 Architecture: Amnesty Plan for Relics of the Raj New York Times, 30 December 2007.
 
 Edwin Lutyens, New Delhi, The Lutyens Trust.
 Dome Over India, by Aman Nath. Published by India Book House, 2006. .

New Delhi
Works of Edwin Lutyens in India
History of Delhi
Neighbourhoods in Delhi
Tourist attractions in Delhi
20th century in Delhi
20th century in British India
British colonial architecture in India